The Eastern Connecticut Highlands AVA is an American Viticultural Area established on October 11, 2019, in Connecticut.  It is located in Hartford, Middlesex, New Haven, New London, Tolland, and Windham counties. The area is one of rolling hills with elevations of 200 to 1,000 feet. There are pronounced ridgelines to the east and west with higher elevations.  The region is relatively cool, with a short growing season between mid-May and mid-September. Its climate is similar to the Finger Lakes region of New York,  The soil in the area is composed of glacial till.  Local vintners have had the most success with cool climate Vitis vinifera and French hybrid grape varieties. The region is located in hardiness zones 6a to 7a.  Sharpe Hill Vineyard in Pomfret is the largest and oldest winery in the AVA. The vineyard petitioned the TTB to lobby for the establishment of the AVA.

References

External links
 

Connecticut wine
Geography of Hartford County, Connecticut
Geography of New Haven County, Connecticut
Geography of Tolland County, Connecticut
Geography of Windham County, Connecticut
Geography of New London County, Connecticut
Geography of Middlesex County, Connecticut
2019 establishments in Connecticut